A special election was held in  September 15–16, 1814 to fill a vacancy left by the resignation of Felix Grundy (DR) earlier that year.

Election results

Cannon took his seat on October 15, 1814.

See also
List of special elections to the United States House of Representatives

References

Tennessee 05
Tennessee 1814 05
Tennessee 05
1814 05
1814 Tennessee elections
United States House of Representatives 1814 05